The Wangshi Group is a geological Group in Shandong, China whose strata date back to the Coniacian to Campanian stages of the Late Cretaceous. Dinosaur remains are among the fossils that have been recovered from the group.

Vertebrate paleofauna

Dinosaurs

Other fauna

Fossil eggs 
The following fossil eggs were recovered from the Jingangkou Formation of the Wangshi Group.
 Saurischia
 Elongatoolithidae
 Elongatoolithus elongatus
 Neornithischia
 Ovaloolithidae
 Ovaloolithus chinkangkouensis
 Ovaloolithus laminadermus

See also 
 List of dinosaur-bearing rock formations

References

Bibliography 

 
 Hu, Cheng, Pang and Fang (2001). Shantungosaurus giganteus: [3 front matter] + ii + 139 pp. + 18 plates (in Chinese with English abstract; publisher's name not translated) 
 

Geologic groups of Asia
Geologic formations of China
Upper Cretaceous Series of Asia
Cretaceous China
Campanian Stage
Coniacian Stage
Santonian Stage
Sandstone formations
Shale formations
Siltstone formations
Conglomerate formations
Fluvial deposits
Ooliferous formations
Paleontology in Shandong